Lenn Kudrjawizki (born 10 October 1975) is a German actor and musician.

Biography 
Lenn Kudrjawizki came with his parents at the age of two months from Leningrad to East Berlin, where his father had a job as a scientist and his mother worked as an interpreter. He discovered violin playing and at the age of 6 he was on stage with the Leningrad State Ballet. He attended an artistic high school, where he received acting, singing and violin lessons. In Dresden he finally studied violin.

From 2001 to 2006 Kudrjawizki was part of the permanent ensemble of the RTL series Abschnitt 40. At the same time, he took part in various cinema and television productions, such as PiperMint - Das Leben, möglicherweise, in the Oscar-winning film  The Counterfeiters by Stefan Ruzowitzky, in Die Päpstin, in the Paramount production Jack Ryan: Shadow Recruit, alongside Kevin Costner directed by Kenneth Branagh and in The Transporter: Refueled - produced and written by Luc Besson and as a commissioner in the ARD - series Der Kroatien-Krimi. He is member of the German Film Academy

Filmography 

 Katrin und Wladimir (1996, TV Movie) - Wladimir
 Tatort (1998-2020, TV Series) - David Kovacic / Milan / Sergej Litvin / Schakir
 Die Cleveren (1999, TV Series)
 Die Entführung (1999, TV Movie)
 England! (2000)
 Enemy at the Gates (2001) - Comrade in Train
 Abschnitt 40 (2001-2006, TV Series) - Polizeimeister Grischa Kaspin
 Die achte Todsünde: Toskana-Karussell (2002)
 Kiki und Tiger (2003, Short) - Tiger
 PiperMint… Das Leben, möglicherweise (2004) - Luka
 Such mich nicht (2004) - Barkeeper Hotel
  (2004, TV Mini-Series)
 Alarm für Cobra 11 – Die Autobahnpolizei (2005-2012, TV Series) - Juri Orlow / Strack
 Große Lügen (2007) - Morgentau
 The Counterfeiters (2007) - Loszek
 Bezaubernde Marie (2007, TV Movie) - André Weber
 Sieben Tage Sonntag (2007) - Police Officer Lupo
 Today Is My Day (2007, Short) - Paul
 Kommissar Stolberg (2007, TV Series) - Philip Schröder
 GSG 9 – Ihr Einsatz ist ihr Leben (2007-2008, TV Series) - Ilyas Balassanjan / Lew Dukin
 Thank You Mr. President (2008, Documentary)
 Die Zeit, die man Leben nennt (2008, TV Movie) - Juri
 Pope Joan (2009) - Jordanes
 Schicksalsjahre (2011, TV Series) - Wladimir Konsolow
 Die letzte Lüge (2011) - Armin
  (2011, TV Movie) - Aljoscha Kasajev (as a Young Man) / Sergej Kasajev
 Notruf Hafenkante (2011, TV Series) - Manfred Gradka
 Die Draufgänger (2012, TV Series) - Priester
 Polizeiruf 110 (2012, TV Series) - Bogdan Kuljakow
 Jack Ryan: Shadow Recruit (2014) - Constantin
 Heldt (2014, TV Series) - Marek
 Ein starkes Team (2014, TV Series)
 Business As Usual – Der Prophet fliegt mit (2014)
  (2015, TV Movie) - Assistant Stevens
 The Transporter Refueled (2015) - Leo Imasova
 Occupied (2015, TV Series) - Orlov
 Vor der Morgenröte (2016) - Samuel Malamud
 Berlin Station (2016, TV Series) - Zoltan Vasile
 Der Kroatien-Krimi (2016–2021, TV Series) - Emil Perica
 Violin (2017, Short) - Leon
 Witnesses (2018) - 'Skripka' - Leon
 Kaddish (2019) - Leonid
 Traumfabrik (2019) - Jurij
 Vikings (2019-2020, TV Series) - Prince Dir
 World On Fire (2019)
 Unorthodox (2020, TV Mini-Series) - Igor
 Der Kroatien-Krimi (2021, TV Series) - Emil Perica
 Babylon Berlin (2021, TV Series)
 Jack Ryan (2021, TV Series)

References

External links 

 Lenn Kudrjawizki personal website
 LEGRAIN Productions 
 
 Lenn Kudrjawizki at his acting agency

1975 births
Living people
German male film actors
21st-century German male actors